Renata Vlachová (born 11 December 1944) is an orienteering competitor who competed for Czechoslovakia. At the 1972 World Orienteering Championships in Jičín she placed 11th in the individual competition, and won a bronze medal in the relay, together with Naďa Mertová and Anna Handzlová. At the 1974 World Orienteering Championships in Viborg she placed fifth in the individual race, and won a bronze medal in the relay, together with Dana Procházková and Anna Handzlová.

References

1944 births
Living people
Czech orienteers
Czechoslovak orienteers
Female orienteers
Foot orienteers
World Orienteering Championships medalists